Coloniconcha prima is a species of air-breathing semi-slug, a terrestrial pulmonate gastropod mollusk in the family Pleurodontidae.

Coloniconcha prima is the only species in the genus Coloniconcha.

It occurs on Hispaniola in Chaîne de la Selle in Haiti and in Baoruco Mountain Range and the Sierra de Martin García in the Dominican Republic.

Coloniconcha prima has a thin semioval shell. The shape of the shell is similar to Vitrina. The color of the shell is yellow with green tint. The shell has 2.5 whorls. The width of the shell is 22.3 mm.

The animal is greenish yellow in color with dark tentacles. Black spots on the mantle are visible through translucent shell.

References

Pleurodontidae
Monotypic mollusc genera
Gastropods described in 1933